The House of Commons Members' Fund Act 2016 is an Act of the Parliament of the United Kingdom, introduced under the Ten Minute Rule by Sir Paul Beresford, to consolidate the provisions of the House of Commons Members' Fund.

Background 
The House of Commons Members’ Fund (HCMF) was established in 1939, before a pension scheme was established in 1964, to help former Members and their dependants who had financial difficulty.

Provisions 
The Bill repeals the following Acts of Parliament:

 House of Commons Members’ Fund Act 1939 - (Established the fund)
 House of Commons Members’ Fund Act 1948 - (Extended assistance to widowers)
 House Of Commons Members’ Fund Act 1957 - (Created Treasury contributions to the fund)
 House of Commons Members’ Fund Act 1962
 House of Commons Members’ Fund and Parliamentary Pensions Act 1981 - (Created pensions for certain former members)
 Parliamentary Pensions etc. Act 1984
 Ministerial and other Pensions and Salaries Act 1991

The Act empowers Trustees to cease requiring contributions from Members (which was previously £2 per member per month) and to return surplus funds to HM Treasury. It also extend the class of beneficiaries to assist all dependants of former Members who experience severe hardship. It would also allow one of the Trustees to be a former MP.

References 

Acts of the Parliament of the United Kingdom concerning the House of Commons
United Kingdom Acts of Parliament 2016
2016 in British law